Laurence Cane-Honeysett is a British musician, producer and music journalist specialising in Jamaican music.

After studying design at Ealing College, London, he performed as a vocalist and guitarist with a number of groups, before working as an illustrator and music journalist, securing a position as the Jamaican music consultant for British music magazine, Record Collector.
 
In the early 1990s, he started working for Trojan Records and soon after joined the company on a full-time basis as its Jamaican music specialist, eventually overseeing the label’s releases and all other aspects of its general running, a position he continues to hold.
 
He has also contributed work to a number of other record labels, including Castle Communications, See For Miles, Snapper Music, Westside, Vibrant, Future Noise, Secret Records, Spectrum, Caroline International, Cherry Red Records and Island Records, while maintaining his position with Trojan Records.
 
In addition, he has occasionally contributed further articles to Record Collector magazine and worked as a consultant on a number of radio and TV programmes.

In 2003 he co-wrote ‘Young, Gifted And Black: The Story Of Trojan Records’ with Michael de Koningh, while 15 years later he authored 'The Story Of Trojan Records' and 'Trojan: The Art Of The Album'.

Bibliography 
Young, gifted and black : the story of Trojan Records / with Michael de Koningh, 2003, Sanctuary Publishing, UK, 
The Story Of Trojan Records, 2018, Eye Books, UK, 
Trojan: The Art Of The Album, 2018, BMG, UK

External links
interview on mohairsweets.mb.ca
Universal Love For Trojan
Recollections Of A Record Collector: The Golden Age
Recollections Of A Record Collector: 2Tone And Reggae On The Cheap
Recollections Of A Record Collector: Trojan Revolution
Recollections Of A Record Collector: Trojan Trials
Recollections Of A Record Collector: Trojan Finds Sanctuary
Recollections Of A Record Collector: A Universal Future

British music critics
Reggae journalists
Year of birth missing (living people)
Living people